The Upper Brownlee School is a historic school building located on Dry Buck Road near Sweet, Idaho, United States. The school was built in 1911 by the residents of Brownlee, one of the several small mining communities which had grown in the Boise River basin in the late 19th century. The two-room schoolhouse was built in keeping with contemporary standards for rural schools; it provided for heating and ventilation, had several windows to provide light, included two cloakrooms and a library room, and featured hand-carved wooden trim for decoration. Like many rural Idaho schools, the schoolhouse also served as the local community center. The declining local population and the expense of new safety regulations in the 1940s spelled the end of Brownlee's school, and the district merged into Sweet's district in 1951. The building was purchased by area residents to serve as a community center and is now the only active community building in the area.

The school was added to the National Register of Historic Places on March 31, 1998.

See also
 List of National Historic Landmarks in Idaho
 National Register of Historic Places listings in Boise County, Idaho

References

1911 establishments in Idaho
Buildings and structures in Boise County, Idaho
School buildings completed in 1911
School buildings on the National Register of Historic Places in Idaho
National Register of Historic Places in Boise County, Idaho